Gustavo Gandarillas (born July 19, 1971 in Coral Gables, Florida) is a retired Major League Baseball pitcher. He played during one season at the major league level for the Milwaukee Brewers. He was drafted by the Minnesota Twins in the third round of the 1992 amateur entry draft. Gandarillas played his first professional season with their Rookie League Elizabethton Twins in 1992, and split his last with the Brewers' Triple-A Indianapolis Indians and Double-A Huntsville Stars in 2002.

He played college baseball at the University of Miami.

External links

Pura Pelota (Venezuelan Winter League)

1971 births
Living people
American expatriate baseball players in Mexico
Baseball players from Florida
Caribes de Oriente players
American expatriate baseball players in Venezuela
Elizabethton Twins players
Fort Myers Miracle players
Fort Wayne Wizards players
Gulf Coast Twins players
Hardware City Rock Cats players
Huntsville Stars players
Indianapolis Indians players
Major League Baseball pitchers
Mexican League baseball pitchers
Miami Hurricanes baseball players
Milwaukee Brewers players
Nashville Xpress players
New Britain Rock Cats players
Pastora de Occidente players
Pawtucket Red Sox players
People from Coral Gables, Florida
Salt Lake Buzz players
Sportspeople from Coral Gables, Florida
Tigres del México players
University of Miami alumni